Rodney Walker may refer to:

Rodney Walker (architect) (1910–1986), American architect
Sir Rodney Walker (rugby league) (born 1943), British sports administrator
Rodney Walker (New Zealand), New Zealand rugby league international

See also
Rod Walker (born 1976), American football player